Lee Jang-mi (Hangul: 이장미; born 25 August 1994) is a South Korean female badminton player. She won her first international title at the 2015 Chinese Taipei Masters Grand Prix in the women's singles event.

Achievements

Asian Championships
Women's singles

Summer Universiade 
Women's singles

BWF Grand Prix 
The BWF Grand Prix had two level such as Grand Prix and Grand Prix Gold. It was a series of badminton tournaments, sanctioned by Badminton World Federation (BWF) from 2007 to 2017.

Women's singles

 BWF Grand Prix Gold tournament
 BWF Grand Prix tournament

BWF International Challenge/Series
Women's singles

 BWF International Challenge tournament
 BWF International Series tournament

References

External links 
 

1994 births
Living people
Sportspeople from Busan
South Korean female badminton players
Universiade medalists in badminton
Universiade silver medalists for South Korea
Medalists at the 2017 Summer Universiade